Santa Teresa del Almendral Airport,  is an airport  north-northwest of Melipilla, a city in the Santiago Metropolitan Region of Chile.

There is distant rising terrain west and north. Runway 27 has an additional  of unpaved overrun.

See also

Transport in Chile
List of airports in Chile

References

External links
OpenStreetMap - Santa Teresa del Almendral
OurAirports - Santa Teresa del Almendral
FallingRain - Santa Teresa del Almendral Airport

Airports in Chile
Airports in Santiago Metropolitan Region